Mira Burt-Wintonick (born July 8, 1984) is a Canadian radio and film producer best known for her audio pieces and work on the CBC radio program WireTap. Trained as a classical musician, Burt-Wintonick pursued a Communications degree from Concordia University in Montreal where she currently resides. Notably, in 2006 Burt-Wintonick was chosen Best New Artist at the Third Coast Festival for her radio essay Muriel's Message. Daughter of Canadian documentary film maker Peter Wintonick, Burt-Wintonick co-produced the road-trip documentary PilgrIMAGE with her father which was a selection at the International Documentary Film Festival Amsterdam in 2008.

Published works

2005: Bitch, Rage, and Roar: video short 
2006: Muriel's Message: radio documentary 
2008: PilgrIMAGE: video documentary
2019: Wintopia: video documentary.

Awards
 2006 Third Coast Festival Best New Artist Award: Muriel's Message

References

External links
Official website 
 
Personal Blog
CBC's WireTap

1984 births
Living people
Concordia University alumni
Canadian radio personalities
Canadian Broadcasting Corporation people
Canadian documentary film directors
Canadian women film directors
Canadian women documentary filmmakers